Heartbeat is the debut album by German singer Sarah Lombardi. It was released on 24 June 2011 through Universal Music Group, following her participation in the eighth season of Deutschland sucht den Superstar. Chiefly produced by DSDS judge Dieter Bohlen, it reached number two on the German Albums Chart. The first single released from the album "Call My Name" was released on 7 May 2011, while the following second single "I Miss You" was issued on 17 June.

Singles
 "Call My Name" was the first single released from the album, it was the winning song on the eighth season of Deutschland sucht den Superstar (DSDS). It was released on 7 May 2011. The song reached number two in Germany, Austria and Switzerland.
"I Miss You" (ft. Pietro Lombardi) was the second single released from the album, it was the first song, that was only made for Sarah Engels. It was released on 17 June 2011. The song reached number two in Germany, number six in Austria and number fourteen in Switzerland.
"Only for You" was the third single released from the album. It was released on 2 September 2011. The song reached number 33 in Germany, number 47 in Austria.
"Love of My Life" was the first promo single from "Heartbeat".

Track listing

Charts

Weekly charts

Year-end charts

References

External links
 http://www.sarahengels.net/releases/ (German)

2011 albums
Sarah Lombardi albums